Ellisburg is a village in Jefferson County, New York, United States. The population was 244 at the 2010 census. The village is named after two brothers who were the original landowners. It is located near the middle of the town of Ellisburg and is southwest of Watertown.

History 

The village was first settled circa 1797 by Lyman Ellis and was also called "Ellisburgh". The village set itself off from the town by incorporation in 1895.

Geography
Ellisburg is located in southern Jefferson County at  (43.731775, -76.133695).

South Sandy Creek flows through the center of the village, leading southwestward to Lake Ontario.

Ellisburg is at the junction of New York State Route 193, New York State Route 289, and County Road 87. NY-289 leads north  to Belleville.

Demographics

As of the census of 2000, there were 269 people, 91 households, and 69 families residing in the village. The population density was 266.1 people per square mile (102.8/km2). There were 100 housing units at an average density of 98.9 per square mile (38.2/km2). The racial makeup of the village was 99.26% White, and 0.74% from two or more races. Hispanic or Latino of any race were 0.37% of the population.

There were 91 households, out of which 45.1% had children under the age of 18 living with them, 57.1% were married couples living together, 15.4% had a female householder with no husband present, and 23.1% were non-families. 17.6% of all households were made up of individuals, and 11.0% had someone living alone who was 65 years of age or older. The average household size was 2.96 and the average family size was 3.34.

In the village, the population was spread out, with 30.9% under the age of 18, 11.9% from 18 to 24, 28.3% from 25 to 44, 19.0% from 45 to 64, and 10.0% who were 65 years of age or older. The median age was 35 years. For every 100 females, there were 94.9 males. For every 100 females age 18 and over, there were 97.9 males.

The median income for a household in the village was $39,750, and the median income for a family was $45,313. Males had a median income of $31,875 versus $20,000 for females. The per capita income for the village was $14,569. About 18.8% of families and 21.6% of the population were below the poverty line, including 35.3% of those under the age of eighteen and none of those 65 or over.

Notable person
John M. McHugh, US Secretary of the Army

References

External links
  Early history of Ellisburg village and town

Villages in New York (state)
Villages in Jefferson County, New York